Your Safety First was a 1956 promotional cartoon created by the Automobile Manufacturers of America. The 13-minute short film set in the year 2000 explains the history of the automobile and the improvements to comfort, performance, and safety that have been made over the years. It led to the development of the animated series The Jetsons, which borrowed heavily on the ideas presented in the cartoon including a three-hour work day, automated flying cars, and robotic arms performing most tasks.

Synopsis
Your Safety First opens with a newspaper from the distant future of October 5, 2000 with headlines reading "Space Travel to Mars" and "tax cuts". The protagonist of the short begins by debating whether to buy a new car or not as his family watches 3-D television. A show then comes on explaining the history of the automobile. The show within the show moves through the beginning of the 20th century starting with hand cranking cars and topless buggies. The clip moves through the decades explaining new inventions like windshield wipers and suspension systems. At the close of the short the character shown in the flashback history of the automobile jumps into a flying car and drives off.

External links
 
 Your Safety First at Archive.org

1956 animated films
1956 films
1950s American animated films
1950s animated short films
American animated short films
Films set in 2000
1950s English-language films